Freddy Santiago Mayola Fernández (born November 1, 1977 in Havana) is a Cuban sprinter who won an Olympic bronze medal in 4 × 100 metres relay at the 2000 Summer Olympics. He also shared in relay silver medals at the 2002 IAAF World Cup and 2000 Ibero-American Championships in Athletics.

He represented his country twice over the 100 m at the World Championships in Athletics, competing in 1999 and 2001.

His run of 6.55 seconds for the 60 metres was the best time by any athlete in 2006. His overall personal best for that event, 6.49 seconds, is the Cuban record.

His best individual results include a 100 m silver medal at the 1999 Pan American Games and a fourth place in 60 metres at the 2001 IAAF World Indoor Championships. He is ranked equal fourth on the all-time 50 metres lists with his best of 5.61 seconds.

Personal bests
100 metres - 10.10 (1999)
200 metres - 20.99 (2004)
60 metres  - 6.49 (2000)

References

1977 births
Living people
Cuban male sprinters
Athletes (track and field) at the 1999 Pan American Games
Athletes (track and field) at the 2000 Summer Olympics
Olympic athletes of Cuba
Olympic bronze medalists for Cuba
Athletes from Havana
Medalists at the 2000 Summer Olympics
Olympic bronze medalists in athletics (track and field)
Pan American Games medalists in athletics (track and field)
Pan American Games silver medalists for Cuba
Medalists at the 1999 Pan American Games
20th-century Cuban people